The 8th Central Committee of the Lao People's Revolutionary Party (LPRP) was elected at the 8th LPRP National Congress in 2006. It was composed of 55 members.

Members

References

Bibliography
 
 

8th Central Committee of the Lao People's Revolutionary Party
2006 establishments in Laos
2011 disestablishments in Laos